Aldwin may refer to:
 Aldwin (bishop) (died between 1015 and 1018), medieval Bishop of London 
 Aldwin (prior), 11th century Anglo-Saxon prior, first prior of Durham monastery
 Aldwin Ferguson (1935–2008), Trinidad and Tobago footballer
 Aldwin Ware American former basketball player
 Aldwin (Stargate), a character in the TV series Stargate SG-1

See also
 Aldwyn
 Alduin (disambiguation)

Old English given names
Germanic given names